58 and 60 Silver Street are grade II listed buildings in Silver Street, Enfield, London. They both date from the late 18th century.

See also
90 Silver Street

References

External links 

Buildings and structures in the London Borough of Enfield
Grade II listed buildings in the London Borough of Enfield
Enfield, London
Georgian architecture in London
Office buildings in London